Vrinda Grover is a lawyer, researcher, and human rights and women's rights activist based in New Delhi, India. As a lawyer, she has appeared in prominent human rights cases and represented women and child survivors of domestic and sexual violence; victims and survivors of communal massacre, extrajudicial killings and custodial torture; sexual minorities; trade unions; and political activists.

Focused on the impunity of the state in relation to human rights violations, her research and writing inquires into the role of law in the subordination of women; the failure of the criminal justice system during communal and targeted violence; the effect of 'security' laws on human rights; rights of undocumented workers; challenges confronting internally displaced persons; and examines impunity for enforced disappearances and torture in conflict situations. Time magazine identified her as one of the 100 most influential people in the world in 2013.

Education
Grover graduated from St. Stephen's College, Delhi, where she was a student in History. She obtained her degree in law from Delhi University and a Masters in Law from New York University.

Career

Law 
Grover has appeared for the victims in prominent cases such as the Soni Sori rape-torture case, 1984 anti-Sikh riots, 1987 Hashimpura police killings, 2004 Ishrat Jahan case, and the 2008 anti-Christian riots in Kandhamal. She contributed to the drafting of the 2013 Criminal Law Amendment to the law against sexual assault; the Protection of Children from Sexual Offences Act, 2012, and the Prevention of Torture Bill, 2010, a law for protection from Communal and Targeted Violence.

In 2001 Parliament Attack case, she served as counsel for S.A.R. Geelani, one of the main accused. In the aftermath of the 2013 Muzaffarnagar Massacre, she represented seven of the gangrape survivors of communal violence.

Organisations 
She worked as the executive director of Multiple Action Research Group (MARG). She was a Research Fellow at the Nehru Memorial Museum & Library, Delhi. She serves as a trustee at the Centre for Social Justice and board member for Green Peace. She has actively engaged with UN human rights mechanisms including the Universal Periodic Review and UN Special Rapporteurs, UN Women India Civil Society Advisory Group; is a bureau member of South Asians for Human Rights (SAHR); a founder member of the Working Group on Human Rights in India and the UN (WGHR). She is also on the global board of The Fund for Global Human Rights.

Activism

Early activism 
In the 1980s, when Grover was a student at St Stephen's College, a 'tradition' existed of rating the female student population according to their physical attributes; the final calibration was summed up into a top 10 'chick chart' and pinned on the official noticeboard. A group of students, including her, decided to protest this. They were told they were breaking 'family tradition' and even threatened with expulsion. But they refused to back down. Ultimately, the institution banned the practice.

Recent years 
She, along with a group of feminist lawyers and activists demanded that documentary India's Daughter be put on hold till the legal process was complete. However, this group of activists clarified that they did not endorse the Indian Government's move to ban the film. She has been vocal in speaking out against the death penalty in India. She spoke out against the appointment of Rajendra Kumar Pachauri as executive vice-chairman of TERI University, who was accused of sexually harassing a research scholar. Pachauri, in turn, filed a civil suit against Vrinda Grover for pursuing the allegations of sexual harassment against him.

Awareness speaker 
She speaks critically of the Armed Forces (Special Powers) Act, the two finger test, and other issues at various events and on news channels.

References

Year of birth missing (living people)
Living people
Indian human rights activists
Delhi University alumni
Time (magazine) people
New York University School of Law alumni
St. Stephen's College, Delhi alumni
Articles created or expanded during Women's History Month (India) - 2015
20th-century Indian lawyers
20th-century Indian women lawyers
21st-century Indian lawyers
21st-century Indian women lawyers